North Yunderup is a locality near Mandurah, Western Australia, located on the north bank of the Murray River within the Shire of Murray. Its postcode is 6208, and in the 2011 Census, it had a population of 849 with a median age of 46, nearly all of whom live in separate dwellings.

References

Towns in Western Australia
Shire of Murray